Pat Passlof (August 5, 1928 – November 13, 2011) was an American abstract expressionist painter.

Biography
Passlof was born in Georgia in 1928 and grew up in New York City, attending Queens College. In the summer of 1948, she studied painting with Willem de Kooning at Black Mountain College, and continued to study with him privately after they returned to New York. That fall, De Kooning introduced her to Milton Resnick. She and Resnick began to live together in the mid-1950s and married in 1962.

Passlof was an integral member of the art scene in New York for six decades; her life, career, and writing intersecting with major touchstones: from “The Club” and the cooperatives on Tenth Street, to the famed Green Gallery, the feminist art movement, to generations of students at the City University of New York. Passlof's earliest work utilized the kinds of biomorphic forms explored also by de Kooning and Gorky; as well as the existentialist ideology which informed Abstract Expressionism. However, Passlof was always very individualistic and her work was constantly varied in terms of touch, form, and palette. She was never content to repeat herself.

In 1949, Passlof helped renovate the Eighth Street loft, which was the first location of “The (Artists') Club,” attending every talk and panel. She considers this the basis of her art education, although she did complete her BFA at Cranbrook in 1951, before returning to her loft on Tenth Street. Noticing that many of her peers rarely spoke when they came to the Club, she decided to organize an alternative “Wednesday Night Club,” envisioning it as a kind of “junior club.” The Wednesday evening sessions quickly became popular, leading the old guard to squelch it for fear of competition. In 1956, Passlof helped found the March Gallery, where she had two exhibitions and helped organize many shows of other artists, including Mark di Suvero's first exhibition. She designed collections of artists' poetry, called Pandemonium.

In 1961 she had a solo exhibition at Dick Bellamy's Green Gallery, and also participated in group shows. In the 1970s, Passlof became central to the organization “Women in the Arts,” reviewing panels and lectures for its magazine. She also wrote for Craft Horizons and occasional reviews for Arts Magazine.

In the 1960s and 1970s she exhibited with the Globe Gallery, the Feiner Gallery, and the Landmark Gallery.

Passlof was the subject of a retrospective exhibition curated by Karen Wilkin at the Milton Resnick and Pat Passlof Foundation in 2020. Her work can be found in the collections of the Corcoran Collection, Washington D.C.; Cranbrook Academy Museum, Bloomfeld Hills, Michigan; the Milwaukee Art Museum, Milwaukee, Wisconsin; the Roswell Museum, Roswell, New Mexico; Weatherspoon Art Gallery, at the University of North Carolina and the Black Mountain College Art Museum, Asheville North Carolina, among others.

A retrospective of her work was held at the Black Mountain College Museum in 2011. A painting was recently acquired by the Museum of Modern Art, and included in its 2017 exhibition, “Making Space: Women Artists and Postwar Abstraction.” Passlof's painting, Untitled, c. 1950 was on view at MoMA, New York.

Passlof died of cancer on November 13, 2011 in New York City. She was 83.

Legacy
The Milton Resnick and Pat Passlof Foundation was established in 2015.

References

External links
 Pat Passlof: Paintings from the 50s by Brett Baker, includes images.
 Art in America: Tenth Street and After, by Raphael Rubinstein

1928 births
2011 deaths
Modern artists
Jewish American artists
Abstract expressionist artists
City University of New York faculty
People from Manhattan
Artists from New York City
American women painters
20th-century American women artists
American women academics
21st-century American Jews
21st-century American women